Hosayellapur is a locality in Dharwad City in Karnataka State, India. It is one of the oldest localities in Dharwad. It belongs to Belgaum Division. Hebballi Agasi, Kamanakai, Khb Colyy, Shivpuri Colo and Maratha Colony are some nearby localities to Hosayellapur.

References

Cities and towns in Dharwad district
Neighborhoods in Dharwad